Samarium(II) chloride (SmCl2) is a chemical compound, used as a radical generating agent in the ketone-mediated intraannulation reaction.

Preparation
Reduction of samarium(III) chloride with samarium metal in a vacuum at a temperature of 800 °C to 900 °C, or with hydrogen gas at 350 °C yields samarium(II) chloride:
2 SmCl3 + Sm → 3 SmCl2

2 SmCl3 + H2 → 2 SmCl2 + 2 HCl

Samarium(II) chloride can also be prepared by reducing samarium(III) chloride with lithium metal/naphthalene in THF:

 SmCl3 + Li → SmCl2 + LiCl

A similar reaction has been observed with sodium.

Structure
Samarium(II) chloride adopts the PbCl2 (cotunnite) structure.

References

Chlorides
Lanthanide halides
Samarium compounds